The Puercan North American Stage on the geologic timescale is the North American  faunal stage according to the North American Land Mammal Ages chronology (NALMA), spanning the interval from 66,000,000 to 63,300,000 years BP lasting . 

It is usually considered to be within the Paleocene. 

The Puercan directly follows the Lancian NALMA, with the K-Pg boundary and K-Pg mass extinction at 66 MYA representing the boundary between the two. The Puercan is followed by the Torrejonian NALMA stage.

Puercan age fossils, from the Great Divide Basin, Wyoming, include three newly identified condylarth members of the Periptychidae; Miniconus jeanninae, Conacodon hettingeri, Beornus honeyi

Substages
The Puercan is considered to contain the following substages:
Pu3: Lower boundary(?) source of the base of the Puercan (approximate).
Pu2: Lower boundary source of the base of Puercan (approximate) and upper boundary source of the base of the Torrejonian (approximate).
Pu1: Lower boundary source of the base of the Puercan (approximate) and upper boundary source of the base of the Torrejonian (approximate).

References

 

 
Paleocene life
Paleocene animals of North America